The Churchill Distaff Turf Mile Stakes is a Grade II American thoroughbred horse race for fillies and mares aged three and older over a distance of one mile on the turf held annually in early May on the Kentucky Derby day meeting at Churchill Downs in Louisville, Kentucky during the spring meeting.

History

This race was inaugurated on 7 May 1983 as the Twin Spires Stakes with conditions for three year olds only over a distance of  miles on the dirt. The event was won by Le Cou Cou after he was declared the winner after racing stewards disqualified High Honors
who lugged in the straight and interfered with Le Cou Cou.

The event was idle for three years and was renewed in 1987 at a shorter distance of  miles. The event was renamed Capital Holding Twin Spires Stakes in 1988 the first on many name changes and was run again with that name in 1989.

In 1990 the event was moved to turf and conditions were modified to the current fillies and mares aged three and older.

The event was classified as Grade III in 1997. The American Graded Stakes Committee upgraded the race to its current Grade II status in 2009. In 2009, this race was upgraded from a Grade III to a Grade II event.

The event has had many different sponsors which have been reflected in the name of the event. In 2000 Churchill Downs administration renamed the event to the current Churchill Distaff Turf Mile Stakes while still accepting sponsorship. With added high profile sponsorship the event has attracted high quality runners in recent years. Tepin, dual winner of the event in 2015 and 2016 won the 2015 Breeders' Cup Mile and in 2016 the prestigious Canadian Grade I Woodbine Mile was crowned US Champion Female Turf Horse in both years.

Records
Speed record:
1 mile:  1:33.96 - Heat Haze (GB) (2003)

Margins
 5 lengths - Fast Forward (1987)

Most wins:
 2 - Foresta (1990, 1991)
 2 - Tepin (2015, 2016)
 2 - Beau Recall (IRE) (2019, 2020)

Most wins by a jockey:
 5 - Pat Day (1987, 1988, 1989, 1993, 1995)

Most wins by a trainer:
 4 - William I. Mott (1996, 2001, 2002, 2011)

Most wins by an owner:
 3 - Juddmonte Farms (2003, 2006, 2011)

Winners

Legend:

 
 

Notes:

† In the 1983 inaugural running, High Honors was first past the post but was disqualified for interference in the straight and Le Cou Cou was declared the winner.

See also
 List of American and Canadian Graded races

External links
 2019 Churchill Downs Media Guide - $400,000 Longines Churchill Distaff Turf Mile

References

Graded stakes races in the United States
Grade 2 stakes races in the United States
Turf races in the United States
Mile category horse races for fillies and mares
Churchill Downs horse races
1983 establishments in Kentucky
Recurring sporting events established in 1983